Dyurtuli (Dürtöylö) is a rural locality (a village) in Novokalchirovsky Selsoviet, Aurgazinsky District, Bashkortostan, Russia. The population was 349 as of 2010. There are 4 streets.

Geography 
Dyurtuli is located 15 km northwest of Tolbazy (the district's administrative centre) by road. Kshanny is the nearest rural locality.

References 

Rural localities in Aurgazinsky District